Albin Jakopič (born 3 February 1912, date of death unknown) was a Slovenian ski jumper. He competed in the individual event at the 1936 Winter Olympics.

References

External links
 

1912 births
Year of death missing
Slovenian male ski jumpers
Slovenian male Nordic combined skiers
Olympic ski jumpers of Yugoslavia
Olympic Nordic combined skiers of Yugoslavia
Ski jumpers at the 1936 Winter Olympics
Nordic combined skiers at the 1936 Winter Olympics
People from the Municipality of Kranjska Gora